Warren Theatres was a movie theater chain based in Wichita, Kansas, United States. While the company was founded by Bill Warren, he sold ownership of most of the Warren Theatres locations to Regal Entertainment Group in 2017. The sale excluded two theaters that were in development and the Palace Theatre in Springfield, Missouri (the location is now closed).

Overview
As of December 2010, the Warren Theatres owned and operated eight theatre complexes in three states.  Warren Theatres operated five theatres named the Warren Theatres, with three in Wichita, Kansas, one in Moore, Oklahoma, and one in Broken Arrow, Oklahoma.  Warren Theatres also operated one theatre, named the Palace Theatre, a second-run location; as well as a five-screen multiplex called the Movie Machine that was located in Towne West Square mall.

Warren Theatres' IMAX was at one point the top grossing IMAX in North America.

The Warren Theatres location in Old Town Wichita was a main venue for the Tallgrass Film Festival, an international, independent film festival.

In April 2018, Regal announced the closure of the Palace West location in Wichita. The final day of screenings occurred on April 8. The Movie Machine was closed in November 2020. In July 2021, Regal would reach agreement with property owner Arvest Bank to reopen the Midwest City location that Warren had closed in March 2020 due to COVID-19.

As of 2020, the website of Warren Theaters is inactive which means the company has fully absorbed into Regal Cinemas.

Midwest City, Oklahoma
In February 2017, Bill Warren announced the return of the Warren Theatres name to a new 14-screen cineplex in Midwest City, Oklahoma. Originally slated for July 25, 2019, the theatre opened August 23 of that year. The theatre closed in March 2020 due to COVID-19 and on September 5, 2020, the property was foreclosed. The theatre was offered at a sheriff's auction sale in January 2021. Property owner Arvest Bank contracted with Regal Entertainment to reopen the location which it did in July 2021.

Locations

Features
Some of the screens at the West 21st street and East 13th street locations featured digital 3D projection, while the rest featured digital projections. Each auditorium of the Moore Warren was equipped with Dolby Digital Cinema, Dolby 3D, Dolby 7.1, and THX certified audio systems. Modeled after the classic art deco theaters in the 1950s, theatres included marble floors and counter-tops, neon lights, and hand-painted murals.

Some locations featured VIP balcony reserved seating, with food delivery from a private bar just outside the auditorium. Warren Theatres received national acclaim when Flaunt Magazine named the chain the top theater builder in the nation.

Digital IMAX
The Warren's IMAX first opened in Wichita on December 17, 2010. The Moore Warren IMAX opened February 24, 2012. Both theaters have 601 seats, a dedicated lobby, 82 ft IMAX 3D screen, a family restroom, and an elevator. The Warren IMAX at the time it opened, was the largest IMAX screen in the world.

See also
 List of IMAX venues

References

External links
 
 Bill Warren’s IMAX theater a world-class success; The Wichita-Eagle; December 25, 2012

Movie theatre chains in the United States
IMAX venues